Kevin Begois (born 13 May 1982) is a Belgian former football player who played as a goalkeeper. He is currently working as a goalkeeper coach for the youth sector of PSV Eindhoven.

Coaching career
After retiring at the end of the 2018-19, Begois was hired as a goalkeeper coach for the youth sector of PSV Eindhoven.

Career statistics

Club

Honours

Club
VVV-Venlo
Eerste Divisie (1): 2008–09

PEC Zwolle
KNVB Cup (1): 2013–14

External links
 
 
 

1982 births
Living people
Belgian footballers
Association football goalkeepers
K.V. Mechelen players
VVV-Venlo players
Roda JC Kerkrade players
Helmond Sport players
FC Den Bosch players
PEC Zwolle players
FC Groningen players
Belgian Pro League players
Eredivisie players
Eerste Divisie players
Belgian expatriate footballers
Expatriate footballers in the Netherlands
Belgian expatriate sportspeople in the Netherlands